Taxodiomyia is a genus of cypress gall midges, insects in the family Cecidomyiidae. There are at least 3 described species in Taxodiomyia.

Species
 T. cupressi (Schweinitz, 1822)
 T. cupressiananassa (Osten Sacken, 1878)
 T. taxodii (Felt, 1911) (cypress leaf gall midge)

References

Further reading

External links

 Diptera.info

Cecidomyiinae
Cecidomyiidae genera